QI is a Dutch panel show, which aired on the television network VARA from December 2008, based on the QI UK format. The show only lasted the first season with six episodes broadcast, and ended on 31 January 2009. The show was hosted by Arthur Japin, with Thomas van Luyn as a permanent panelist.

Season one 
Each episode in the season instead have different themes. Six episodes were broadcast on TV and the show was not renewed for a second series.

References

External links
Official site via Internet Archive

QI
2008 Dutch television series debuts
2000s Dutch television series
Dutch comedy television series
2009 Dutch television series endings
Television game shows with incorrect disambiguation
NPO 1 original programming